The Field Day Theatre Company began as an artistic collaboration between playwright Brian Friel and actor Stephen Rea. In 1980, the duo set out to launch a production of Friel's recently completed play, Translations. They decided to rehearse and premiere the play in Derry with the hope of establishing a major theatre company for Northern Ireland. The production and performance of Translations generated a level of excitement and anticipation that unified, if only for a short time, the various factions of a divided community.

Although Field Day has never put forth a formal mission statement, their intention was to create a space, a 'fifth province,' that transcended the crippling oppositions of Irish politics.  The term 'fifth province' — Ireland now consists of four provinces, but the Irish term cúige signifies 'a fifth portion' and there were five historic provinces  – was coined by the editors of an Irish Journal, The Crane Bag, to name an imaginary cultural space from which a new discourse of unity might emerge. In addition to being an enormous popular and critical success, Field Day's first production created just such a space. After the production of Translations, Seamus Heaney, Ireland's most prominent poet, recognised the importance of what they had accomplished and urged Brian Friel to continue with the project: "this was what theatre was supposed to do" (cited in Richtarik, 65).

That the company was established in Derry, Northern Ireland's "second city," is significant. Although Friel knew the city well (he had lived there until 1967), Derry, being close to the border, was a hot-spot in the north-south tensions during "The Troubles". Furthermore, its western location and its relationship to Belfast, Northern Ireland's east coast capital, underline a second historically older division in Ireland – the division between the cosmopolitan east and the rural, romantic west.

More than theatre
What began with a desire to develop a local Northern Irish theatre and make it available to a popular audience, quickly grew into a much larger cultural and political project. Even before the company's opening performance, four prominent Northern Irish writers were invited to join the project — Seamus Deane, David Hammond, Seamus Heaney, and Tom Paulin; they would eventually become Field Day's board of directors. (Thomas Kilroy, the only member born in the Republic, joined the board in 1988). All of the members of Field Day agreed that art and culture had a crucial role to play in the resolution of what had come to be known as "the Troubles":

The directors believed that Field Day could and should contribute to the solution of the present crisis by producing analyses of the established opinions, myths and stereotypes which had become both a symptom and a cause of the current situation.  (Ireland's Field Day vii)

Field Day became an artistic response to the violence, history and politics which divided Northern Ireland into a series of seemingly irresolvable dichotomies; Orange/Green, Unionist/Nationalist and Protestant/Catholic are only the most prominent.

Field Day Publishing
Every year saw a new production open in Derry and begin a tour of venues large and small throughout both Northern Ireland and the Republic. While Field Day's artistic venture continued to fulfil its original mandate of bringing "professional theatre to people who might otherwise never see it" (Richtarik 11), in September 1983 they launched a project whose target audience was primarily the academic community. The Field Day Theatre Company began publishing a series of pamphlets "in which the nature of the Irish problem could be explored and, as a result, more successfully confronted than it had been hitherto" (Ireland's Field Day viii).

The first set of three pamphlets were written by directors of the Field Day Company – Tom Paulin, Seamus Heaney and Seamus Deane.  The pamphlets were largely responsible for entering Field Day into the political debate whose calcified terms the project had originally wanted to explode.  With Tom Paulin's Riot Act (1984) the division between critic and artist began to crumble, the politics of the pamphlets were finding their way into the plays (Richtarik 242).

In the 1990 introduction to Nationalism, Colonialism, and Literature — a collection of three Field Day Pamphlets by Terry Eagleton, Fredric Jameson and Edward Said — Deane writes: "Field Day's analysis of the (Northern Irish) situation derives from the conviction that it is, above all, a colonial crisis" (Eagleton 6).  In this essay Deane calls for a re-engagement with the concept of nationalism, and positions Field Day in a squarely antithetical position to those he refers to as revisionist historians and critics, whose chief aim is "to demolish the nationalist mythology" (6).  The categories of revisionist and anti-revisionist were all too easily superimposed onto the categories of unionist and nationalist, and the space between them, created by the production of Translations, was closing fast. For some, Seamus Deane had become the de facto spokesman, and Field Day became increasingly associated with republican politics and post-colonial theory.

By this time Field Day was no longer a novel experiment; it was part of the establishment: "That Field Day was attacked for being nationalist and for being anti-nationalist was a positive sign insofar as it proved that the company was raising questions generally, but the fact that the debate had narrowed so quickly to the old terms indicated that Field Day was losing the moral and artistic high ground" (Richtarik 249).

In 2005, Field Day Publications was launched in association with the Dublin school of the Keough-Naughton Institute for Irish Studies at the University of Notre Dame, Indiana.  With Seamus Deane as General Editor, the company's first publication was Field Day Review 1, an annual journal primarily concerned with Irish literary and political culture, but in an international context. To critical acclaim, Field Day Review has published essays and interviews by numerous eminent academics, including Benedict Anderson, Giovanni Arrighi, Maud Ellmann, Tariq Ali, Terry Eagleton, Pascale Casanova, Alan Ahearne, Kevin Whelan, David Lloyd, Brendan O'Leary, Luke Gibbons, Joe Cleary, Claire Connnolly and Catherine Gallagher. Field Day Review 10 was published in October 2014.

To date, Field Day Publications has published 24 titles in the fields of literary criticism, history, Irish art music, cultural studies, art history and 18th-century Irish poetry.

The Field Day Anthology of Irish Writing
From the beginning Field Day struggled to establish a cultural identity, not just for the North, but for the Irish. Much like the stated intentions of the Irish National Theatre established by W. B. Yeats and Lady Gregory almost one hundred years earlier (Harrington vii), the goal was not just to reach or represent an audience, but to create an audience.  History, and Field Day's post-colonial sensibilities, determined that the construction of Irishness would often be worked out against notions of Britishness.  In a pointed and humorous verse epistle, "An Open Letter," Heaney responds to his inclusion in The Penguin Book of Contemporary British Poetry:

 You'll understand I draw the line
 At being robbed of what is mine,
 My patris, my deep design
   To be at home
 In my own place and dwell within
   Its proper name—
 (Ireland's Field Day 26)

The Field Day directors recognised that in order for Ireland to claim "Its proper name" Irish literature would need its own comprehensive anthology .

In 1991 Field Day Published the three-volume Field Day Anthology of Irish Writing, edited by Seamus Deane.  The project, according to Deane, was nothing less than an "act of definition", one which he hoped would be inclusive and representative of the plurality of Irish identity:  "There is a story here, a meta-narrative, which is, we believe, hospitable to all the micro-narratives that, from time to time, have achieved prominence as the official version of the true history, political and literary, of the island's past and present".  The Anthology was immediately attacked by Field Day's critics as politically biased. The anthology's most conspicuous flaw, however, was the paucity of women writers. In response to the accusations that Field Day had elided the female voice, a new all-female board of editors issued two additional volumes (2002), which exceeded the first three in length.

Journalism, Podcasting, and Annual Seamus Deane Lecture
Starting in early 2017, Field Day started to commission articles for every issue of Village Magazine, a leftist current affairs publication issued in Dublin. The Field Day Podcast appeared in January 2018.
The annual Seamus Deane Lecture was inaugurated in 2015 with a lecture by Deane himself. The 2016 lecture was delivered by Bernadette Devlin McAliskey, and in 2017-18 a set of three lectures were delivered by Dr Bryan McMahon, Dr. Conor Kenny of Médecins sans Frontières, and by Seamus Deane himself. In 2022, lectures were delivered by Angus Mitchell and by Brendan O'Leary.

Bibliography
 Deane, Seamus, ed., et al. Field Day Anthology of Irish Writing. 5 volumes. Derry: Field Day, 1991 and 2002.
 Deane, Seamus, ed. Ireland's Field Day. London: Hutchinson, 1985.
 "Dramatic field of vision" The Irish Times, 2006-10-11 [also at HighBeam Research ].
 Eagleton, T. Jameson, F. Said, E. Nationalism, Colonialism and Literature.  Minneapolis: University of Minnesota Press, 1990.
 Harrington, John P., ed. Modern Irish Drama. New York: W.W. Norton, 1991.
 McMinn, Joe, Cultural Politics and the Ulster Crisis, in Parker, Geoff (ed.), Cencrastus No. 23, Summer 1986, pp. 35 - 39, 
 Ó Duibhne, Cormac. 'The Field Day Archive'. Dublin: Field Day, 2007.
 O'Malley, Aidan. Field Day and the Translation of Irish Identities: Performing Contradictions. Basingstoke and New York: Palgrave Macmillan: 2011.
 Pine, Richard. Brian Friel and Ireland's Drama. New York: Routledge, 1990.
 Pine, Richard. The Diviner: the Art of Brian Friel. Dublin: University College Dublin Press, 1999.
 Richtarik, Marilynn J. Acting Between the Lines: The Field Day Theatre Company and Irish Cultural Politics 1980–1984. Oxford: Clarendon Press, 1994.

References

Culture in Derry (city)
Theatre companies in Northern Ireland